HMS Fame was a 24-gun French privateer, La Renommee taken in the Mediterranean in July 1709. She was surveyed at Port Mahone 6 July 1709 and fitted out as per Admiral Byng's order. She was commissioned into the Royal Navy in July 1709 for service in the Mediterranean. She was retaken by three French ships off Port Mahone 21 September 1710.

Fame was the third named ship since it was used for a 24-gun sixth rate launched by Ellis of Shoreham on 29 November 1695, renamed Newport on 3 September 1698, and sold in 1714.

Specifications
She was captured in July 1709 and surveyed on 6 July 1709. Her tonnage calculation was  tons. Her armament was twenty-four, reduced to twenty-two guns.

Commissioned Service
She was commissioned on 15 July 1709 under the command of Commander Strensham, RN for service in the Mediterranean.

Disposition
She was retaken by the 56-gun La Toulouse, the 40-gun La Vestal and the 30-gun La Meduse off Port Mahone on 21 September 1710 on 27 May 1709. She resumed her French name La Gaillarde.

Citations

References
 Winfield, British Warships in the Age of Sail (1603 – 1714), by Rif Winfield, published by Seaforth Publishing, England © 2009, EPUB , Chapter 6, The Sixth Rates, Vessels acquired from 18 December 1688, Sixth Rates of 20 guns and up to 26 guns, Ex-French Prizes (1704–09), Fame (Prize)
 Colledge, Ships of the Royal Navy, by J.J. Colledge, revised and updated by Lt Cdr Ben Warlow and Steve Bush, published by Seaforth Publishing, Barnsley, Great Britain, © 2020, e  (EPUB), Section S (Fame)

 

1700s ships
Corvettes of the Royal Navy
Naval ships of the United Kingdom